Abdul Ghafoor Assar (عبدالغفور عصار ) was an Afghan footballer who competed at the 1948 Summer Olympic Games. He also appeared for Mahmoudiyeh F.C.

References

External links
 
 
 

Afghan men's footballers
Olympic footballers of Afghanistan
Footballers at the 1948 Summer Olympics
Possibly living people
Year of birth missing
Association football goalkeepers
Footballers at the 1951 Asian Games
Asian Games competitors for Afghanistan